Criminal tradition - of the cultural transmission of criminal values. Criminal traditions are transmitted from the older generation to the younger generation, such as social customs are in other forms of society.

Studies of the criminal tradition involved  Clifford R. Shaw and Henry D. McKay. They put forward a theory of “cultural transmission”, focuses on the development in some urban neighborhoods of a criminal tradition that persists from one generation to another despite constant changes in population. This theory stresses the value systems of different areas

Also worth noting theory of “differential association,” in which  Edwin H. Sutherland described the processes by which criminal values are taken over by the individual. Edwin H. Sutherland asserted that criminal behavior is learned and that it is learned in interaction with others who have already incorporated criminal values.

Research by Shaw and McKay on the concept of cultural transmission indicates that a criminal tradition or subculture does exist in areas of  larger cities.  According to their studies Criminal tradition arises and is maintained in areas of instability, and the values, norms, and behaviors of the participants in the criminal tradition are viewed as normal by these people.

Population categories subject to criminal traditions 

Traditions are not personified, so adolescents and boys are easier to obey than direct instructions from specific individuals. This is the power of tradition. The norms of the life of groups in which the will of their members manifest themselves take the form of tradition most often. In the tradition that there is no personification, adolescents find it easier to obey them than to a particular person. Against this background, the criminal traditions that are prevalent in youth criminal groups, especially in closed educational and correctional institutions are especially dangerous. In a criminal environment, there are two kinds of traditions:

 They came to us from the criminal environment of the distant past and transformed into modern ones, taking into account the conditions of life of society and the relations dominating in it;
 New traditions that have arisen and established in a criminal environment in modern conditions and have no analogues in the past.

At the same time, there is a transformation of existing criminal traditions and the emergence of new ones. The reason for this is the changes in the social, economic, legal and other spheres.

World criminal tradition 

On the criminal tradition in different countries of the world, there is a huge amount of work. There is an impressive number of works on the Russian criminal tradition, written in different languages. 
We can also highlight works by Jonny Steinberg on the numbers gangs of South Africa

Alternative opinions 

There is also the view that it is impossible to consider all the traditions of the criminal environment as antisocial and harmful, including, for the reason that some of the traditions in the cells of the remand center, contribute to hygiene and the maintenance of sanitary norms.

Russian criminal tradition  

In Russian criminal tradition adherents of the criminal (criminal) tradition are characterized by active participation in the life of the "thieves' community"; Living on tangible assets obtained by criminal means; Propaganda of "thieves' customs and traditions, as well as criminal way of life; Compulsion to keep a word not only before the "brother", but also the criminal-criminal world; Organization of collection of "obschekovyh" funds and control over their use; Guardianship and assistance to detainees and convicts, the so-called "vagabonds" and "honest prisoners"; Compliance with the decisions of "gatherings"; Demanding of "brotherhood" and control over their compliance; Organization of counteraction to state bodies.

Sources 

 Juvenile delinquency : readings, authors: Jon'a Meyer; Joseph G Weis; Weis-Crutchfield-Bridges
  CRIMINAL RUSSIA - ESSAYS ON CRIME IN THE SOVIET UNION, Author V. CHALIDZE, 1977
  A Sociological Technique in Clinical Criminology  by Saul D Alinskiy
 RESIDENTIAL SUCCESSION AND DELINQUENCY A Test of Shaw and McKay's Theory of Cultural Transmission, Authors ROBERT E. KAPSIS

References 

Crime
Tradition
Sociology of law
Culture